Ailinglaplap or Ailinglapalap (Marshallese:) is a coral atoll of 56 islands in the Pacific Ocean, and forms a legislative district of the Ralik Chain in the Marshall Islands. The economy of the atoll is dominated by coconut plantations. The population of the atoll was 1,729 in 2011. Jabat Island is located off the coast of Ailinglaplap Atoll. The former president of the Marshall Islands, Kessai Note, was born on Jeh Island, Ailinglaplap Atoll.

"Ailinglaplap" translates as "greatest atoll" ( (atoll) +  (superlative suffix)), because the greatest legends of the Marshallese people were created there.  The four major population centers on Ailinglaplap Atoll are the settlements of Wotja, at the westernmost end of the atoll, Jih in the northeast, and Airek and Bigatjelang in the south.

History
Captain Thomas Dennet of the British vessel Britannia sighted the atoll in 1797 on route from Australia to China and named it Lambert Island.
The British merchant vessel Rolla sighted several islands in the Ratak and Ralik Chains. The next day six canoes of friendly natives came off. Rolla had transported convicts from Britain to New South Wales and was on her way to Canton to find a cargo to take back to Britain.

In 1884, the Empire of Germany claimed Ailinglaplap Atoll along with the rest of the Marshall Islands. A number of European trading stations were established on the islands to Ailingkaplap as part of the copra trade. After World War I, the island came under the South Seas Mandate of the Empire of Japan. The base became part of the vast US Naval Base Marshall Islands. Following the end of World War II, it came under the control of the United States as part of the Trust Territory of the Pacific Islands until the independence of the Marshall Islands in 1986.

There are currently 4 Iroijlaplap (or paramount chief) of Ailinglaplap.

Infrastructure
There are 3 airstrips on the atoll, which are served by Air Marshall Islands when its aircraft are operational:
 Ailinglaplap Airok Airport  is located to the south: .
 Jeh Airport  is located to the northeast: .
 Woja Airport  is located to west: .

Education
Marshall Islands Public School System operates public schools:
 Aerok Ailinglaplap
 Buoj Elementary School
 Enewa Elementary School
 Jah Elementary School
 Jeh Elementary School
 Jobwon Elementary School
 Katiej Elementary School
 Mejel Elementary School
 Woja Elementary School

Students are zoned to Jaluit High School in Jaluit Atoll.

In the 1994–1995 school year Ailinglaplap had one private high school.

References

External links
Marshall Islands site

Atolls of the Marshall Islands
Ralik Chain
Municipalities of the Marshall Islands